The 1923–24 season was the 26th in the history of the Southern League. The league was split into Eastern and Western Divisions. Peterborough & Fletton United won the Eastern Division and Yeovil & Petters United won the Western Division. Yeovil were declared Southern League champions after defeating Peterborough 3–1 in a championship play-off. No clubs applied to join the Football League this season, and no clubs left the league at the end of the season.

Eastern Division

A total of 16 teams contest the division (previously called the English section), including 10 sides from previous season and six new teams.

Newly elected teams:
 Peterborough & Fletton United
 Folkestone
 Kettering
 Bournemouth & Boscombe Athletic II (replacing their first team, which had been promoted to the Football League the previous season)
 Leicester City II
 Northampton Town II

Western Division

A total of 18 teams contest the division (previously called the Welsh section), including 6 sides from previous season, 8 teams transferred from English section and four new teams.

Teams transferred from 1922–23 English section:
 Bath City
 Torquay United
 Yeovil & Petters United
 Bristol City II
 Bristol Rovers II
 Exeter City II
 Plymouth Argyle II
 Swindon Town II
Newly elected teams:
 Llanelly
 Weymouth - (newly elected from the Western League)
 Cardiff City II
 Newport County II

References

1923-24
1923–24 in English football leagues
1923–24 in Welsh football